RuBee (IEEE standard 1902.1) is a two way active wireless protocol designed for harsh environment and high security asset visibility applications. RuBee utilizes longwave signals to send and receive short (128 byte) data packets in a local regional network. The protocol is similar to the IEEE 802 protocols in that RuBee is networked by using on-demand, peer-to-peer, and active radiating transceivers. RuBee is different in that it uses a low frequency (131 kHz) carrier. One result is that RuBee is slow (1,200 baud) compared to other packet based network data standards (WiFi). 131 kHz as an operating frequency provides RuBee with the advantages of ultra low power consumption (battery life measured in many years), and normal operation near steel and/or water. These features make it easy to deploy sensors, controls, or even actuators and indicators.

The IEEE 1902.1 protocol details

1902.1 is the "physical layer" work group with 17 corporate members. The work group was formed in late 2006. The final specification was issued as an IEEE standard in March 2009. The standard includes such things as packet encoding and addressing specifications. The protocol has already been in commercial use by several companies, in asset visibility systems and networks (see www.rubee.com). However, IEEE 1902.1 will be used in many sensor network applications, requiring this physical layer standard in order to establish interoperability between manufacturers. A second standard has been drafted 1902.2 for higher level data functions required in Visibility networks. Visibility networks provide the real-time status, pedigree and location of people, livestock, medical supplies or other high-value assets within a local network. The second standard will address the data-link layers based on existing uses of the RuBee protocol. This standard, which will be essential for the widespread use of RuBee in visibility application's, will support interoperability of RuBee tags, RuBee chips, RuBee network routers and other RuBee equipment at the data-link layer.

RuBee tag details

 RuBee is bidirectional, on-demand, and peer-to-peer. It can operate at other frequencies (e.g. 450 kHz) but 131 kHz is optimal. RuBee tags can have sensors (temperature, humidity, jog), optional displays and may have a full 4 bit microprocessor with static memory. The RuBee protocol uses an IP Address (Internet Protocol Address). A tag may hold data in its own memory (instead or in addition to having data stored on a server). Some tags have as much as 5 kB of memory. RuBee functions successfully in harsh environments, with networks of many thousands of tags, and has a range of 1 to 30 m (3 to 100 ft) depending on the antenna configuration. By 'harsh environment' we mean situations in which one or both ends of the communication is near steel or water. RuBee radio tags function in environments where other radio tags and RFID may have problems. RuBee networks are in use in many visibility applications, including: exit entry detection in high security government facilities, weapons and small arms in high security armories, mission critical specialized tools, smart shelves and racks for high-value assets; smart entry/exit portals.

RuBee disadvantages and advantages

The major disadvantage RuBee has over other protocols is speed and packet size. The RuBee protocol is limited to 1,200 baud in existing applications. The IEEE 1902.1 specifies 1,200 baud. The protocol could go to 9,600 baud with some loss of range. However, most visibility applications work well at 1,200 baud. Packet size is limited tens to hundreds of bytes. RuBee's design forgoes high bandwidth, high speed communication because most visibility applications do not require them.

The use of LW magnetic energy brings about a number of advantages:

 Long battery life – Because of the use of low frequencies and data rates the chips and detectors can run at low speed. Using (lowest cost) 4 micrometre CMOS chip technology, this leads to extremely low power consumption. LW magnetic wave tag systems can, and have, achieved 15-year lives using low-cost lithium batteries. This is also the expected battery shelf life.
 Tag data travels with the asset – Because data is stored in the tag, IT (Information Technology) costs are reduced. This means that with a low-cost handheld reader one can read a RuBee tag and learn about the asset — manufacturing data, expiry date, lot number, etc. — without having to go to an IT system to look it up. In addition, the distance between the reader and the asset is not critical. RuBee can also write to a tag at the same range as it can read it. RFID, on the other hand, uses EEPROM memory, and writing to the tag is awkward. (In the case of RFID, range is limited, more power is required and write times are long.)
 Human-safe – A RuBee base station produces only nanowatts of radio energy. RuBee's LW magnetic waves are not absorbed by biological tissues and are not even regulated by OSHA. In fact, RuBee produces less power and lower field strengths than the metal detectors in airports and the anti-theft detectors in retail stores operating at similar frequencies — by a factor of about 10 to 100. Recently published studies show that RuBee has no effect on pacemakers or other implantable devices (Hayes et al., 2007).
 Intrinsically safe – A RuBee base station and tag produce a low level of magnetic energy not capable of heating explosives or creating a spark. In independent studies carried out by the Department of Energy RuBee was given a Safe Separation Distance (SSD) of zero, and is the only wireless technology to have that rating. That means tags and base stations can be placed directly on high explosives with no risk of accidental ignition or any heating.
 High security and privacy  RuBee tags have many unique advantages in high security applications. The eavesdropping range (the range at which a person with unlimited funds can listen to tag conversations) is the same as tag range. That means if someone is listening, they must be close enough for you to be able to see them. This is not true for RFID or 802 protocols. That means no one can secretly listen to tag/base station conversations. In addition, since RuBee tags have a battery, a crystal and sRAM memory, they can use strong encryption with nearly uncrackable one time keys, or totally uncrackable one time pads. RuBee is in use today in many high security applications for these reasons. RuBee is the only wireless technology approved for use in secure US government sites.
 Controlled volumetric range – RuBee has a maximum volumetric range of approximately 10,000 square feet (900 m²), using volumetric loop antennas — From even a small volumetric antenna of 1 sq ft (900 cm²), RuBee can read a tag within an egg-shaped (ellipsoid) volume of about 10 x 10 x 15 ft (3 x 3 x 5 m). A special feature of IEEE P1902.1 known as Clip makes it possible to place many adjacent loop antennas in an antenna farm, and read from tens to hundreds of base-stations simultaneously.
 Cost effective - With RuBee, relatively simple base stations and routers can be employed, which means receivers and card readers can be reasonably priced as compared to higher frequency transceivers. In addition, the tags often include a single chip, a battery, a crystal and an antenna, and can be priced competitively with respect to active RFID tags (those including a battery).
 Less noise – Because ambient noise in a region falls off as 1/r³, RuBee exhibits reduced susceptibility to extraneous noise. The major limit to antenna size is deep space noise.

Compare to NFC and Qi inductive power transfer 

This protocol is similar at the physical level to NFC (13.56  MHz carrier, basically an air-core transformer pair) and also Qi's inductive energy transfer (100 kHz-300 kHz carrier). Both modulate the receiver's coil load to communicate to the sender. Some NFC tags can support simple processors and a handful of storage like this protocol. NFC also shares the physical security properties of "magnetic" communications like RuBee, however NFC signals can be detected miles from the source.

Notes

References

 Prithvi Raj, 2007 North American Supply Chain Visibility Solutions Technology Innovation of the Year Award, Frost&Sullivan Frost & Sullivan
 "IEEE Begins Wireless, Long-Wave Standard for Healthcare, Retail and Livestock Visibility Networks; IEEE P1902.1 Standard to Offer Local Network Protocol for Thousands of Low-Cost Radio Tags Having a Long Battery Life," Business Wire, June 8, 2006
 "Visible Assets Promotes RuBee Tags for Tough-to-Track Goods," by Mary Catherine O'Connor, RF Journal, June 19, *2006, http://www.rfidjournal.com/article/articleprint/2436/-1/1/
 Charles Capps, "Near Field or Far Field," EDN, August 16, 2001, pp. 95–102. This excellent article is available online at: Near Far Field RF - New link (correct?)
 Hayes DL, Eisinger G, Hyberger L, Stevens JK. Electromagnetic interference (EMI) and electromagnetic compatibility (EMC) of an active kHz radio tag (Rubee [TM], IEEE P1901.1) with pacemakers (PM) and ICDs. Heart Rhythm 2007;4:S398 (Supplement - Abs). Mayo Clinic Study
 Martin Roche MD, Cindy Waters RN, Eileen Walsh RN, Visibility Systems in Delivery of Orthopedic Care Enable Unprecedented Savings and Efficiencies. U.S. Orthopedic Product News, May/June 2007 Orthopedic Visibility

Radio-frequency identification